King Bee was an American band formed in Portland, Oregon, United States in 1976 and consisted of Fred Cole on vocals and guitar, Mark Sten on bass and Pat Conner on drums. Cole had sung and written songs for bands such as The Weeds (also known as Lollipop Shoppe), and Zipper, but King Bee marked his debut as a guitarist. According to Cole's wife (Conner's sister) Toody, the band initially sounded "grungy, rhythm and bluesy, swampy" but "happened to get a spot playing in Portland on the bill with The Ramones the first time they came through." King Bee was inspired by the high-energy punk sounds of The Ramones, and in 1978 released the low fidelity single "Hot Pistol" on Cole's Whizeagle label. However, the band soon folded, and Cole's frustration with short-lived lineups led him to teach his wife Toody how to play bass, leading to the formation of The Rats and later Dead Moon.

Discography
 "Hot Pistol" (single, 1978)

Literature

References

Punk rock groups from Oregon
Musical groups from Portland, Oregon
1976 establishments in Oregon
1978 disestablishments in Oregon
Musical groups established in 1976
Musical groups disestablished in 1978